The Legend of the Mystical Ninja, known as  in Japan, is an action-adventure game by Konami, and was released for the Super Nintendo Entertainment System in 1991. It was also ported to the Game Boy Advance along with Ganbare Goemon 2: Kiteretsu Shōgun Magginesu only in Japan.

It is the first game in the Japanese video game series Ganbare Goemon to have a western release. It has also been released for the Virtual Console in Japan, Europe, Australia, New Zealand, Canada, and the United States. In North America and Europe, this game was followed by two different games for Nintendo 64, Mystical Ninja Starring Goemon in 1998 and Goemon's Great Adventure (known in Europe as Mystical Ninja 2 Starring Goemon) in 1999, as all subsequent releases for the Super NES were absent of a Western release. In Europe, two Game Boy versions of Mystical Ninja starring Goemon were released. One was a standalone game and the other was part of Konami GB Collection Vol. 3.

Gameplay
Although both characters have different weapons and learn different attacks, they are functionally identical. Their primary short-range weapons have three levels and are improved in range by acquiring grey cats left by defeated enemies. Both characters are also equipped with thrown weapons from the beginning (which decreases money as the player uses it) and can acquire bombs by purchasing them in stores or by winning them in mini-games.

Each character can learn four Judo abilities which are functionally identical between the two characters. Level 1 Judo provides an animal companion for the character which they ride and can use to ram into enemies. Level 2 Judo releases an attack that can damage all enemies on the screen. Level 3 Judo gives the characters the ability to fly temporarily. Level 4 Judo unleashes a powerful repetitive attack.

Most stages (known as "Warlock Zones") are separated into two sections. The first section is centered on town exploration where players gather information, buy items, learn special Judo attacks, play minigames, earn money, etc. One of the most notable mini-games available is a recreation of the first level in Gradius, but also includes games such as air hockey, trivia, dice games, and even a lottery.

The second section of each stage is a platforming section where the players fight through minor enemies until they reach the end and defeat a boss. In two-player mode, the characters can work together by having one ride the other piggy-back style. The character riding controls the attacks, while the character being ridden controls the movement and jumping. This can simplify areas with large or awkward jumps as it only requires one player to land successfully. After each stage is completed, a small scene occurs furthering the mostly simple and lighthearted plot, and the next stage is revealed.

Plot
The players control Goemon (loosely inspired by the historical Goemon) and Ebisumaru (the two are called Kid Ying and Dr. Yang respectively in all non-Japanese releases of this game).

After noticing some odd occurrences in their hometown of Oedo, involving a Ghost Woman at the local temple and ghost animals that come from the temple at night, Goemon and Ebisumaru decide to investigate. After defeating the Ghost Woman, she reveals herself to be Kurobei, a ninja cat. She explains that she was looking for strong people to help her, then offers the duo money and tells them to search for her boss, Koban, on Shikoku Island. Upon arrival, they find Hyotoko dancers in town during a festival, of whom some of the townspeople are suspicious. After finding and defeating the Lantern Man, leader of the evil dancers, they rescue Koban, who informs them that Princess Yuki, daughter of the Emperor, is believed to have been kidnapped by an odd group of mimes and clowns counterfeiters known as the Otafu Army. His clan of ninja cats were unable to investigate further because of devices the army has that disable their shapeshifting powers. He then directs the duo to nearby Awaji Island, where Goemon and Ebisumaru find that the army has set up a bizarre, anachronistic amusement park. The pair then make their way across the park to the nearby town of Yamato, where they discover that the army has been recruiting the townspeople. Upon invading the Otafu HQ and defeating its leaders, they free Yae, the ninja. She tells them that the Otafu Army never had Yuki, but that a wise man in Iga may be able to help them. The Old Wise Man's palace in Iga is guarded by an army of robotic clockwork ninjas, and the pair fight through the palace and its leader, Sasuke, to get to the old man's chamber. The Old Wise Man tells them that the White Mirror in the Dragon Pond of faraway Izumo can find what they seek. He uses his "Miracle Transport Machine" (which is only a cannon) to shoot them there. To save the princess, the protagonists must travel through different regions of Japan to find clues about the army and the location of the princess.

Reception

The game was critically acclaimed. In 1992, Super Play stated: "Still one of the best games for the system (if you like this sort of thing), mixing RPG adventure-style wandering with side-on platform action. It's got some wonderful oriental music, beautifully drawn graphics and is a supremely addictive challenge." Super Gamer magazine gave the game a review score of 89% writing: "an enjoyable mix of varied arcade action and RPG adventuring."  In 2010, the game was included as one of the titles in the book 1001 Video Games You Must Play Before You Die. GamesRadar ranked it as the 45th best SNES game for its "stellar ancient Japan-inspired soundtrack, beautiful graphics alive with color, and just enough challenge to make it a very addictive affair. It’s not breaking down any barriers for platforming or RPGs, but it’s definitely one of the top games on the SNES." In 1995, Total! rated the game 79th on their Top 100 SNES Games writing: "It’s a mixture of arcade action and role playing and what’s more it’s a right bloody good laugh." IGN listed the game 32nd in its "Top 100 SNES Games of All Time."

According to Electronic Gaming Monthly, the game "didn't catch on too much in the U.S." but was popular in Japan.

Sequels
Three direct sequels were released for the Super Famicom: Ganbare Goemon 2: Kiteretsu Shogun Magginesu in 1993, Ganbare Goemon 3: Shishijyūrokubei no Karakuri Manji Katame, and Ganbare Goemon Kirakira Douchū: Boku ga Dancer ni Natta Wake both in 1994.

Notes

References

External links
 Legend of the Mystical Ninja SNES review at Mean Machines Archive
 

1991 video games
Cooperative video games
Ganbare Goemon games
Super Nintendo Entertainment System games
Video games developed in Japan
Virtual Console games
Virtual Console games for Wii U
Video games set in Japan
Video games based on Japanese mythology